Chris Horn (born November 11, 1973) is a retired American stock car racing driver. Horn competed in eight NASCAR Xfinity Series races and twenty-nine NASCAR Camping World Truck Series races.

References

External links
 

 
Living people
1973 births
NASCAR drivers
Sportspeople from Cedar Rapids, Iowa
Racing drivers from Iowa